Tanja Dragić (born May 15, 1991) is a Paralympian athlete from Serbia competing mainly in category F12/13 javelin events.

At the 2012 Summer Paralympics held in London, she won a gold medal in javelin and posted new world record 42.51m.

External links
The Official Website of the London 2012 Paralympic Games - Tanja Dragić Profile 

1991 births
Living people
Paralympic gold medalists for Serbia
Paralympic athletes of Serbia
Athletes (track and field) at the 2012 Summer Paralympics
Serbian female javelin throwers
World record holders in Paralympic athletics
Serbs of Croatia
Medalists at the 2012 Summer Paralympics
Paralympic medalists in athletics (track and field)